Phillip Wheeler (born April 13, 1978) is an American attorney and politician serving as a member of the Kentucky Senate from the 31st district. He assumed office on March 19, 2019.

Early life and education 
Wheeler was born in Pikeville, Kentucky in 1978. He earned a Bachelor of Arts degree in history and German from Transylvania University and a Juris Doctor from the University of Kentucky College of Law. Wheeler was a Fulbright scholar in 2000 and 2001.

Career 
Outside of politics, Wheeler works as a lawyer at the Kirk Law Firm, PLLC. As a lawyer, Wheeler has represented former coal miners who suffer from black lung disease. He was elected to the Kentucky Senate in a March 2019 special election, succeeding Ray Jones. He also serves as vice chair of the House Economic Development, Tourism and Labor Committee.

References 

Living people
1978 births
People from Pikeville, Kentucky
Transylvania University alumni
University of Kentucky College of Law alumni
Kentucky lawyers
Republican Party Kentucky state senators